"The Marshes of Glynn" is one of Sidney Lanier's poems featured in Hymns of the Marshes, an unfinished set of lyrical nature poems that describe the open salt marshes of Glynn County in coastal Georgia. While some believe the poem was written while Lanier was visiting the area in 1875, there is speculation that the majority was written in Baltimore during 1878 as part of an entry for the anthology A Masque of Poets, a collection of works from various artists. Although A Masque of Poets received poor reviews from readers, "The Marshes of Glynn" was considered by critics to be one of the better entries of the book.

See also
 Glynn County, Georgia for information about the setting of The Marshes of Glynn.

References

External links
 Hymns of the Marshes which includes "The Marshes of Glynn"
 Sidney Lanier biography at the New Georgia Encyclopedia

American poems
Glynn County, Georgia
Georgia (U.S. state) in fiction

ca:Sidney Lanier